Stadionul Colentina is a multi-use stadium in Bucharest, Romania. It is the home ground of Daco-Getica București and holds 6,000 people, all seated.

References

Sports venues in Bucharest
Football venues in Romania
ASC Daco-Getica București